The Oratory of Santa Maria delle Grazie (Holy Mary of the Graces), sometimes called a church, is a Baroque religious edifice in central Parma.

Construction of the Oratory began in 1617, under the designs of the local architect Gian Battista Magnani. In 1644, the architect Girolamo Rinaldi installed the peculiar octagonal lantern. The interior contains a number of Baroque paintings, including works (1715) by  Sebastiano Galeotti.

References

17th-century Roman Catholic church buildings in Italy
Roman Catholic churches in Parma
1617 establishments in Italy
Baroque architecture in Parma